Riccardo Genovese (born 13 April 2002) is an Italian professional rugby union player who primarily plays prop for Zebre Parma of the United Rugby Championship.

Professional career 
He previously played for clubs such as CUS Torino.
Rizzoli signed for Zebre Parma in May 2022 ahead of the 2022–23 United Rugby Championship as Academy Player.

In 2021 and 2022 Genovese was named in Italy U20s squad for annual Six Nations Under 20s Championship.

References

External links 
All Rugby Profile
It's Rugby UK Profile

2002 births
Living people
Sportspeople from Turin
Italian rugby union players
Rugby union props
Zebre Parma players